Bishop Denis J. O'Connell High School (also known as DJO) is a Roman Catholic college preparatory school founded in 1957 in Arlington County, Virginia.  It was established by the Diocese of Richmond, but it has been under the direction of the Diocese of Arlington since 1974. The school is named for Bishop Denis J. O'Connell, Bishop of Richmond from 1912 to 1926.

Brief History 
On September 9, 1957, under the auspices of the Catholic Diocese of Richmond, Bishop Denis J. O'Connell High School opened its doors as a co-institutional college preparatory school, admitting 360 ninth-graders. Greeting the class of 1961 were Brothers of Christian Schools and Sisters, Servants of the Immaculate Heart of Mary (IHM), who would guide their education. Since then, Bishop O'Connell has graduated more than 18,000 men and women. Today, the school serves the students from more than 80 different schools throughout the Washington, D.C. metropolitan area.

Academics
Bishop O'Connell High School holds high expectations for its students, faculty, and staff. The academic program is organized around required courses that aim to achieve desired learning goals for each student. All students follow a demanding college preparatory curriculum designed to ready them for admission to the leading colleges and universities. The Muller Academic Services Program provides support for students with documented learning disabilities. Coursework is available at the Honors and Advanced Placement levels. Dual credit and dual enrollment opportunities are also available through a partnership with Marymount University. The Global Studies Certificate Program offers optional beyond-the-classroom learning experiences focused on themes of world importance. The school also offers Expanded Services for students with intellectual and cognitive disabilities.

Advanced Placement Program

These AP Courses are offered to students:

Honors Program

Honors classes are also offered in a variety of academic areas.  These courses are offered at the honors level:

Activities

Athletics

Bishop O'Connell High School participates in the Washington Catholic Athletic Conference (WCAC). In this league, O'Connell participates in all major sports against other Catholic high schools of the D.C. metro area.

Rivalries 
Since the mid-1980s, the school's primary athletic rival has been Paul VI Catholic High School, located in Chantilly.   

Bishop Ireton High School, located in Alexandria, Virginia, is another major athletic rival.

Basketball

Boys' Varsity Team
These are some statistics from the last five years of O'Connell Varsity Boys' Basketball:

Soccer
The Girls' Varsity Soccer team were National Champions in 2004. 

The Boys Varsity Soccer team beat the 19-0-1 DeMatha Stags on October 31, 2006, in the conference quarter-finals. The victory prevented DeMatha, who at one point this season was ranked number 1 in the nation, from winning their 4th straight WCAC title.  This resulted in the defeat of DeMatha's 67-game unbeaten streak.  The team then lost to Paul VI 2–1 in the semi-final round of the WCAC tournament.

Clubs

O'Connell has over 100 student-organized clubs. Their focuses are generally academic, service, and/or common interest. Some current clubs include: (listed alphabetically)

Charitable events

Superdance

The O'Connell Superdance is an annual 12-hour dance-a-thon held at the school which raises money for the Cystic Fibrosis Foundation. The Superdance is organized and run by students.  It was started under the administration of principal Msgr. James McMurtrie. O'Connell students began holding the Superdance in 1976 because students wanted to speed the discovery of a cure for cystic fibrosis (CF), a fatal disease of the lungs which had claimed the life of sophomore Brenda O'Donnell on April 14, 1975. Her sister, Maura, was a senior in 1976 and also suffered from cystic fibrosis. Their brother, Sean, died of cystic fibrosis that same year.

Maura O'Donnell graduated and went on to nursing school at Marymount University, continuing to support the Superdance in hopes that a cure would be found. Her last Superdance was in 1978 when she came out of the hospital just for the event. In a speech delivered to the O'Connell community, she stated:
"All of you I know have dreams – dreams of college, of success, of love and happiness – dreams of the future. We with cystic fibrosis have dreams too. Your wonderful all-out efforts and work for this dance-a-thon may help make some of our dreams come true."

Two months later, she died of this disease.

As of 2018, O'Connell students have raised over $4,300,000 for the Cystic Fibrosis Foundation, an organization dedicated to finding a cure for the disease.

Hearty Soup Drive and Living Rosary 
The Hearty Soup Drive is held annually throughout the month of October. Students have a month to collect as many cans of hearty soup as possible. At the end of the month, cans are collected and donated to the local Catholic Charities food bank. The school collects approximately 10,000 cans of soup each year. At the end of the week, all the cans are displayed on the football field (weather permitting) or inside the auditorium. The student body gathers to celebrate their successful event and pray a special Living Rosary, praying for those who will ultimately benefit from their soup collection.

Notable alumni

Arts and entertainment 
 Mike Brooks (Class of 1973) - Television news correspondent
 Pat McGee (Class of 1991): Singer-songwriter, guitarist; founding member and frontman of the Pat McGee Band
David Monahan (Class of 1989): Actor
Mary Catherine “Taffy” Nivert (Class of 1962) - Grammy-award winning singer-songwriter
Geoff Sprung (Class of 1996) - Member of the band Old Dominion

Athletics

Basketball
 Keljin Blevins (Class of 2014) - Former Montana State and current Portland Trail Blazers player
 Jason Clark (Class of 2008) - Former Georgetown and current professional player
 Junior Etou (Class of 2014) - Congolese basketball player for Hapoel Be'er Sheva of the Israeli Basketball Premier League
 Marcus Ginyard (Class of 2005) - Former University of North Carolina and professional player
 Xavier Johnson (Class of 2018) - Current Indiana University player
 Matt Lewis (Class of 2017) - Former James Madison University and current professional player for the Iowa Wolves
 Kendall Marshall (Class of 2010) - Former University of North Carolina and professional player
 Melo Trimble (Class of 2014) - Former University of Maryland and current professional player

Football
Bob Asher (Class of 1966) - Played for the Dallas Cowboys and Chicago Bears.
Casey Crawford (Class of 1995) - Former University of Virginia and NFL player, and Super Bowl XXXVII winner with the Tampa Bay Buccaneers; CEO and co-founder of Movement Mortgage
Gibran Hamdan (Class of 1998) - Former Indiana University and NFL player, played for the Buffalo Bills
Eric Metcalf (Class of 1985) - Former University of Texas and NFL player and three-time Pro Bowl selection for the Cleveland Browns and Los Angeles Chargers. Was also a college long jumper who won the NCAA National Long Jump Championship in 1986 and 1988
Kamrin Moore (Class of 2014) - Former Boston College and NFL player, played the New York Giants
Terrence Wilkins (Class of 1994) - Former University of Virginia and NFL player, and won Super Bowl XLI with the Indianapolis Colts

Soccer
Nataly Arias (Class of 2004) - Member of the Colombia National Soccer team during the 2011 Women's World Cup in Germany.
Kika Toulouse (Class of 2007) - Former professional player in the NWSL

Swimming
Kate Ziegler (Class of 2006) - Former world record holder in the 1500m freestyle

Other 
 Jimmy Lange (Class of 1995) - Former professional boxer
 Mike Storm (Class of 1977) - Former pentathlete and Olympic silver medalist

Politics, law, and military 
 Edward DeMarco (Class of 1978) - Former acting director of the Federal Housing and Finance Agency (FHFA)
 Mark Kimmitt (Class of 1972) - Former Assistant Secretary of State 
 Robert Kimmitt (Class of 1965) - Former United States Deputy Secretary of the Treasury and U.S. Ambassador to Germany
 James Morhard (Class of 1974) - Former Deputy Administrator of NASA and deputy sergeant-at-arms of the U.S. Senate
 James Nealon (Class of 1973) - Former U.S. Ambassador

Controversy 

On the morning of May 7, 2002, on D.C. metro area shock jock Elliot Segal's radio program, DC101's Elliot in the Morning was conducting a contest. The winners of this contest would be cage dancers at an upcoming Kid Rock concert at George Mason University's Patriot Center. Two sixteen-year-old O'Connell pupils, claiming to be eighteen, called the show, and disclosed alleged sexual activity at O'Connell. The principal addressed pupils over the PA system and criticized the content of the radio show. The two days of broadcasting were ruled indecent by the Federal Communications Commission (FCC). As a result, in October 2003, sixteen months after the incident, DC101's parent company Clear Channel Communications was fined $55,000.

Footnotes

External links

Bishop O'Connell High School (official site)
Bishop O'Connell Virtual Tour

Educational institutions established in 1957
Catholic secondary schools in Virginia
Schools in Arlington County, Virginia
1957 establishments in Virginia
Roman Catholic Diocese of Arlington